Baron Graves, of Gravesend in the County of Londonderry, is a title in the Peerage of Ireland. It was created on 24 October 1794 for the naval commander Admiral Thomas Graves. He was second in command at the Battle of the Glorious First of June in 1794. His son, the second Baron, represented Okehampton, Windsor and Milborne Port. He was succeeded by his son, the third Baron. This line of the family failed on the death of his son, the fourth Baron, in 1904.

The fourth Baron was succeeded by his first cousin, the son of the Hon. Henry Richard Graves, third son of the second Baron. On the death of his own son and only male heir, this line of the family also failed.

The sixth Baron was succeeded by his first cousin, the son of Claude Thomas Graves, third son of the Hon. Henry Richard Graves, third son of the second Baron. His son, the eighth Baron, was an actor (as Peter Graves). When the eighth Baron died in 1994, this line of the family also failed. He was succeeded by his second cousin, the ninth Baron, the grandson of the Hon. Adolphus Edward Paget Graves, fifth son of the Hon. Henry Richard Graves, third son of the second Baron.  the title is held by his son, the tenth Baron, who succeeded in 2002, and who, like his father, also lives in Australia.

Barons Graves (1794)

Thomas Graves, 1st Baron Graves (1725–1802)
Thomas North Graves, 2nd Baron Graves (1775–1830)
William Thomas Graves, 3rd Baron Graves (1804–1870)
Clarence Edward Graves, 4th Baron Graves (1847–1904)
Henry Cyril Percy Graves, 5th Baron Graves (1847–1914)
Clarence Percy Rivers Graves, 6th Baron Graves (1871–1937)
Henry Algernon Claude Graves, 7th Baron Graves (1877–1963)
Peter George Wellesley Graves, 8th Baron Graves (1911–1994)
Evelyn Paget Graves, 9th Baron Graves (1926–2002)
Timothy Evelyn Graves, 10th Baron Graves (born 1960)

There is no heir to the barony.

References

Sources

 Kidd, Charles, Williamson, David (editors). Debrett's Peerage and Baronetage (1990 edition). New York: St Martin's Press, 1990.
 

Baronies in the Peerage of Ireland
Noble titles created in 1794
1794 establishments in Ireland